Shi Yuhao (born 26 September 1998) is a Chinese male track and field athletes who competes in the long jump.

This gained him qualification for the 2017 World Championships in Athletics and on his senior global debut he finished sixth in the final.

Shi established himself among the region's best athletes with a gold medal at the 2018 Asian Indoor Athletics Championships – his winning mark of 8.16 m was a world-lead and nearly half a metre ahead of the opposition.

International competitions

See also
Chinese Athletics Championships
Long jump: 2017

References

External links

Living people
1998 births
Chinese male long jumpers
Chinese male triple jumpers
World Athletics Championships athletes for China
Asian Indoor Athletics Championships winners
21st-century Chinese people